Archichauliodes is a genus of fishflies in the family Corydalidae. There are more than 20 described species in Archichauliodes.

Species
These 21 species belong to the genus Archichauliodes:

 Archichauliodes anagaurus Riek, 1954
 Archichauliodes chilensis Kimmins, 1954
 Archichauliodes collifer Theischinger, 1983
 Archichauliodes conversus Theischinger, 1983
 Archichauliodes cuspidatus Theischinger, 1983
 Archichauliodes deceptor Kimmins, 1954
 Archichauliodes diversus (Walker, 1853)
 Archichauliodes glossa Theischinger, 1988
 Archichauliodes guttiferus (Walker, 1853)
 Archichauliodes isolatus Theischinger, 1983
 Archichauliodes lewis Theischinger, 1983
 Archichauliodes neoguttiferus Theischinger, 1983
 Archichauliodes phaeoscius Riek, 1954
 Archichauliodes pictus Theischinger, 1983
 Archichauliodes pinares Flint, 1973
 Archichauliodes piscator Theischinger, 1983
 Archichauliodes plomleyi Kimmins, 1954
 Archichauliodes polypastus Riek, 1954
 Archichauliodes rieki Theischinger, 1983
 Archichauliodes simpsoni Theischinger, 1983
 Archichauliodes uncinatus Theischinger, 1983

References

Further reading

 

Corydalidae
Aquatic insects